Theni taluk is a taluk of Theni district of the Indian state of Tamil Nadu. The headquarters of the taluk is the town of Theni.

Demographics
According to the 2011 census, the taluk of Theni had a population of 199,921 with 100,313 males and 99,608 females. There were 993 women for every 1,000 men. The taluk had a literacy rate of 75.2%. Child population in the age group below 6 years were 9,343 Males and 8,880 Females.

References 

Taluks of Theni district